Guzzanti is a surname of Italian origin. It may refer to:

Elio Guzzanti (1920–2014), Italian academic and politician; uncle of Paolo
Paolo Guzzanti (b. 1940), Italian journalist and politician; father of Corrado, Sabina and Caterina
Sabina Guzzanti (b. 1963), Italian actress and satirist; daughter of Paolo
Corrado Guzzanti (b. 1965), Italian actor, director, writer and satirist; son of Paolo
Caterina Guzzanti (b. 1976), Italian actress and satirist; daughter of Paolo

Italian-language surnames